Euthymius or Euthymios may refer to:

 Saint Euthymius the Great (377–473), Christian saint

Christian Patriarchs:
Patriarch Euthymius I of Constantinople (834–917)
Patriarch Euthymius II of Constantinople (c. 1340–1416)
Patriarch Evtimiy of Bulgaria (Euthymius of Tarnovo) (1325–1402)
Euthymius II Karmah, 17th-century Melkite Patriarch of Antioch 
Euthymius III of Chios, 17th-century Melkite Patriarch of Antioch 

Other people:
Euthymius of Sardis, Bishop of Sardis (840) 
Euthymius of Athos (ca. 955–1028), Georgian philosopher and scholar
Euthymius of Constantinople (11th century), 11th-century monk
Euthymius Zigabenus, 12th century monk and commentator of the Bible
Euthymios Saifi (1643–1723), Melkite Catholic bishop of Tyre and Sidon
Euthymios (Agritellis) of Zela (1876–1921), Greek Orthodox Bishop of Zela, in Amasia, Western Pontus
Euthymius (Moiseyev) (born 1972), Russian Orthodox Bishop of Lukhovitsy